Guo Yue may refer to:

Guo Yue (musician) (born 1958), Chinese musician, virtuoso of dizi and bawu 
Guo Yue (table tennis) (born 1988), Chinese table tennis player